Petra Gerster [] (born 25 January 1955) is a German journalist and news presenter.

Early life and education 
Starting in 1973, Gerster studied German studies, Slavic studies, and literature with a grant of the German Academic Scholarship Foundation at the University of Konstanz, as well as in the US and in Paris. In 1981 she received a Master of Arts.

Career 
Gerster began her career as a newspaper journalist with Kölner Stadt-Anzeiger. From 1989, she worked as a TV journalist for ZDF. She was a presenter on the German women's magazine show Mona Lisa for ten years.

From 1998 until 2021, Gerster worked as anchor for ZDF's daily news magazine heute, in rotation with Peter Hahne (1998–1999), Klaus-Peter Siegloch (1999–2003), Steffen Seibert (2003–2010), Matthias Fornoff (2010–2014) and Christian Sievers (2014–2021).

Other activities 
 Witten/Herdecke University, Member of the Supervisory Board
 Hertie Foundation, Member of the Board of Trustees
 Wormser Dom, Member of the Board of Trustees

Personal life 
Gerster is the sister of politician Florian Gerster and is married to journalist and politician Christian Nürnberger. They live in Mainz.

Literature 
 Petra Gerster, Christian Nürnberger: Der Erziehungsnotstand. Wie wir die Zukunft unserer Kinder retten. Berlin (Rowohlt-Verlag). 2002. 
 Petra Gerster, Christian Nürnberger: Stark für das Leben. Wege aus dem Erziehungsnotstand. Berlin (Rowohlt-Verlag). 2003. 
 Petra Gerster: Reifeprüfung: Die Frau von 50 Jahren. Berlin (Rowohlt-Verlag). 2007. 
 Petra Gerster, Andrea Stoll: Ihrer Zeit voraus. Frauen verändern die Welt. Munich (cbj Verlag). 2009. 
 Petra Gerster, Christian Nürnberger: Charakter: Worauf es bei Bildung wirklich ankommt, Berlin (Rowolth-Verlag). 2010. 
 Petra Gerster: Es wächst zusammen... Wir Deutschen und die Einheit. Cologne (Lingen Verlag), 2010.

Awards 
 1996: Hanns-Joachim-Friedrichs-Award

References

External links 
 ZDF:Petra Gerster
 German National Library:Petra Gerster
 Mindener Tageblatt:Interview with Petra Gerster (german)

German television presenters
German television reporters and correspondents
German broadcast news analysts
People from Worms, Germany
Living people
1955 births
German women television presenters
German women television journalists
20th-century German journalists
21st-century German journalists
ZDF people
20th-century German women
21st-century German women